Lee-Roy Walters (born 3 December 1986) is a South African cricketer who plays as a wicket-keeper. A right-handed batsman, he has played for the Boland province team since the 2004/05 season.

References
Lee-Roy Walters profile at CricketArchive

1986 births
Living people
Cricketers from Paarl
South African cricketers
Boland cricketers